The Dreamer or Il morbidone is a 1965 Italian film directed by Massimo Franciosa.

Cast
Paolo Ferrari as Giovanni
Anouk Aimée as	Valeria
Sylva Koscina as Irene
Beba Lončar as Laura
Margaret Lee as	Daniela
Guido Alberti as Uncle Marco
Ferruccio De Ceresa as	Ettore
Loredana Nusciak as Donata
Gina Rovere as Nurse
Jacques Herlin as Marcello
Giuliana Lojodice as Paola
Tatyana Pavlova as	Antonia
Vera Vergani as Giovanni Zenobi's Mother
Moa Tahi as Oriental girl
Renato Terra

External links
 

1965 films
Italian drama films
1960s Italian-language films
Films directed by Massimo Franciosa
Films scored by Piero Umiliani
1960s Italian films